Michael Blum (born 25 December 1988 in Düsseldorf) is a German footballer who plays for BFC Dynamo.

Career
On 30 April 2010, he announced his transfer from Karlsruher SC on a two-year deal to MSV Duisburg.

References

External links 
 
 

1988 births
Living people
German footballers
Association football midfielders
Karlsruher SC II players
Karlsruher SC players
Footballers from Düsseldorf
FC Hansa Rostock players
MSV Duisburg players
VfL Osnabrück players
SV Elversberg players
SV Eintracht Trier 05 players
Wuppertaler SV players
Chemnitzer FC players
2. Bundesliga players
3. Liga players
Association football defenders